Dayer Uberney Quintana Rojas (born 10 August 1992 in Cómbita) is a Colombian cyclist, who currently rides for UCI ProTeam . He is the younger brother of fellow professional cyclist Nairo Quintana, who also rides for the  team. His first professional victory was stage 3 of the 2014 Tour of Austria. In August 2020, he was named in the startlist for the 2020 Tour de France.

Major results

2013
 2nd Clásica Santiago en Cos
2014
 5th Prueba Villafranca de Ordizia
 9th Overall Tour of Austria
1st Stage 3
 10th Dutch Food Valley Classic 
2016
 1st  Overall Tour de San Luis
2018
 1st Stage 6 Colombia Oro y Paz
 8th Overall Vuelta a San Juan
2019
 6th Overall Adriatica Ionica Race
 7th Overall Giro di Sicilia

Grand Tour general classification results timeline

References

External links

1992 births
Living people
Colombian male cyclists
Sportspeople from Boyacá Department
21st-century Colombian people